Manavi was originally formed by six South Asian women: Shamita Das Dasgupta, Radha Sarma Hegde, Shashi Jain, Rashmi Jaipal, Vibha Jha, and Kavery Dutta, as a consciousness raising group interested in addressing concerns faced by South Asian women in the U.S. In a short period of time, this New Jersey based organization expanded its goals in response to requests from the community to begin providing services to women facing violence and abuse.

Overview
Founded in 1985, Manavi (meaning 'primal woman' in Sanskrit) was the first organization in the U.S to specifically address the needs of South Asian women, who are victims of violence. Although started as a consciousness-raising group, Manavi's founders soon realized that South Asian women facing abuse were unable to seek help from local authorities and mainstream organizations for variety of reasons. These reasons could be attributed to cultural, lingual and immigration barriers, among others.

Since Manavi came to existence, many other South Asian organizations for women have been formed in the U.S along the lines of Manavi. Today, Manavi continues to be a pioneer by championing new strategies for advancing the South Asian women's movement in the U.S and by constantly adapting its service provision to the changing needs of South Asian women living in the U.S.

While providing direct service to South Asian women in need, Manavi is also a social change agent within the South Asian community.  In addition, it is a cultural competency educator and diversity trainer in the mainstream movement to end violence against women in the U.S. In short, Manavi simultaneously addresses both the immediate needs of women facing abuse and the long-term vision of establishing peaceful communities free from gender-based violence.

External links
Manavi website
The Pluralism Project at Harvard University

1985 establishments in New Jersey
Asian-American culture in New Jersey
Asian-American feminism
Asian-American women's organizations
Feminist organizations in the United States
Indian-American culture in New Jersey
Organizations established in 1985
South Asian American organizations
Women in New Jersey